Patriarch Sava may refer to:

 Patriarch Sava IV, Serbian Patriarch from 1354 to 1375
 Patriarch Sava V, Serbian Patriarch from 1396 to 1406

See also
List of heads of the Serbian Orthodox Church
Archbishop Sava (disambiguation)